Castles N' Coasters is an amusement park and family amusement center located in Phoenix, Arizona. The approximately  park features four outdoor 18-hole miniature golf courses, several rides, and an indoor video game arcade. The park was built in 1976, and is designed in a Middle-Eastern motif though other eras are featured such as the Wild West-themed miniature golf course and log flume ride.

Other attractions includes a go-kart track, bumper cars, bumper boats, 2 roller coasters called Patriot and Desert Storm, some thrill rides including Magic Carpet, Sea Dragon, Free Fall and Sky Diver drop rides, and a log flume called Splashdown.

History
In 1976, the entertainment park originally opened under the name "Golf n' Stuff". It later turned into "Castles N' Coasters" in 1992 after adding its Ride Park. Also expanding to 10 acres which brought two roller coasters, Desert Storm and Patriot, as well as a multilevel arcade.

Rides and attractions
Roller coasters

Amusement rides

 Li'l Indy is a go-cart track that passes under the Desert Storm roller coaster (above).
 Bumper Boats
 Arcades
 Miniature Golf features four courses.  Each have trick shots, multiple themes, and many water features.

Incidents
On May 1, 2005, eleven people were left stranded for nearly three hours after a free fall ride malfunctioned. Reports indicate that the floorless, four-sided passenger cabin jerked as it ascended the tower. The cabin, guided by cables, normally drops to the bottom of the 120-foot-tall tower and comes to a stop, however when it reached the halfway point on its ascent, it made loud screeching noises and came to a sudden halt. It took firefighters nearly three hours to rescue the riders, who were locked in their seats about 30 feet above the ground.

The park's manager says that the ride would be closed until investigators determined what caused the malfunction.

On March 30, 2015, two young boys suffered burns when the bumper boat they were in caught fire.

On November 28, 2015,  a twelve-year-old boy named Dominick Leal was seriously injured after falling from the park’s Splashdown attraction after standing during the ride, and required immediate emergency brain surgery.

On May 15, 2021, fire crews rescued 22 people that were stuck on the Desert Storm rollercoaster. Investigators said the cars on the coaster stalled and the riders were stuck about 20 feet up on a horizontal loop. It's unclear what caused the roller coaster car to get stuck.

References

External links 
 Castles N' Coasters Official Website

Details with images

Amusement parks in Arizona
1976 establishments in Arizona
Buildings and structures in Phoenix, Arizona
Tourist attractions in Phoenix, Arizona